The gargoyle fish or small-eye rattail, Coelorinchus mirus, is a species of rattail found around southeast Australia and between New Zealand and the Chatham Islands.

References

 
 Tony Ayling & Geoffrey Cox, Collins Guide to the Sea Fishes of New Zealand,  (William Collins Publishers Ltd, Auckland, New Zealand 1982) 

Macrouridae
Fish described in 1926